Tyrus Raymond Cobb (December 18, 1886 – July 17, 1961), nicknamed "the Georgia Peach", was an American Major League Baseball (MLB) center fielder. He was born in rural Narrows, Georgia. Cobb spent 22 seasons with the Detroit Tigers, the last six as the team's player-manager, and finished his career with the Philadelphia Athletics. In 1936, Cobb received the most votes of any player on the inaugural ballot for the National Baseball Hall of Fame, receiving 222 out of a possible 226 votes (98.2%); no other player received a higher percentage of votes until Tom Seaver in 1992.  In 1999, the Sporting News ranked Cobb third on its list of "Baseball's 100 Greatest Players."

Cobb is widely credited with setting 90 MLB records during his career. His combined total of 4,065 runs scored and runs batted in (after adjusting for home runs) is still the highest ever produced by any major league player.  He still holds several records as of the end of the 2022 season, including the highest career batting average (.366) and most career batting titles with 11 (or 12, depending on source). He retained many other records for almost a half century or more, including most career hits until 1985 (4,189 or 4,191, depending on source), most career runs (2,245 or 2,246 depending on source) until 2001, most career games played (3,035) and at bats (11,429 or 11,434 depending on source) until 1974, and the modern record for most career stolen bases (892) until 1977. He still holds the career record for stealing home (54 times) and for stealing second base, third base, and home in succession (4 times), and as the youngest player ever to compile 4,000 hits and score 2,000 runs. Cobb ranks fifth all time in number of games played and committed 271 errors, the most by any American League (AL) outfielder.

Cobb's legacy, which includes a large college scholarship fund for Georgia residents financed by his early investments in Coca-Cola and General Motors, has been somewhat tarnished by allegations of racism and violence, primarily stemming from a couple of mostly-discredited biographies that were released following his death. Cobb's reputation as a violent man was fanned by his first biographer, sportswriter Al Stump, whose stories about Cobb have been discredited as sensationalized, and have largely proven to be fictional. While he was known for often violent conflicts, he spoke favorably about black players joining the Major Leagues and was a well-known philanthropist.

Early life
Cobb was born in 1886 in Narrows, Georgia, a small, unincorporated rural community of farmers. He was the first of three children born to William Herschel Cobb (1863–1905) and Amanda Chitwood Cobb (1871–1936). Cobb's father was a state senator.

When he was still an infant, his parents moved to the nearby town of Royston, where he grew up. By most accounts, he became fascinated with baseball as a child, and decided he wanted to play professional ball one day; his father was vehemently opposed to this idea, but by his teen years, he was trying out for area teams. He played his first years in organized baseball for the Royston Rompers, the semi-pro Royston Reds, and the Augusta Tourists of the South Atlantic League, who released him after only two days. He then tried out for the Anniston Steelers of the semipro Tennessee–Alabama League, with his father's stern admonition ringing in his ears: "Don't come home a failure!" After joining the Steelers for a monthly salary of $50, Cobb promoted himself by sending several postcards written about his talents under different aliases to Grantland Rice, the Atlanta Journal sports editor. Eventually, Rice wrote a small note in the Journal that a "young fellow named Cobb seems to be showing an unusual lot of talent." After about three months, Cobb returned to the Tourists and finished the season hitting .237 in 35 games. In August 1905, the management of the Tourists sold Cobb to the American League's Detroit Tigers for $750.

On August 8, 1905, Cobb's mother fatally shot his father with a pistol that his father had purchased for her. Court records indicate that Mr. Cobb had suspected his wife of infidelity and was sneaking past his own bedroom window to catch her in the act. She saw the silhouette of what she presumed to be an intruder and, acting in self-defense, shot and killed her husband. Mrs. Cobb was charged with murder and then released on a $7,000 recognizance bond. She was acquitted on March 31, 1906. Cobb later attributed his ferocious play to his late father, saying, "I did it for my father. He never got to see me play ... but I knew he was watching me, and I never let him down."

Cobb was initiated into Freemasonry in 1907, earning the 32nd degree in 1912.

In 1911, Cobb moved to Detroit's architecturally significant and now historically protected Woodbridge neighborhood, from which he would walk with his dogs to the ballpark prior to games. The Victorian duplex in which Cobb lived still stands.

Professional career

Early years
Three weeks after his mother killed his father, Cobb debuted in center field for the Detroit Tigers. On August 30, 1905, in his first major league at bat, he doubled off Jack Chesbro of the New York Highlanders. Chesbro had won 41 games the previous season. Cobb was 18 years old at the time, the youngest player in the league by almost a year. Although he hit only .240 in 41 games, he signed a $1,500 contract to play for the Tigers in 1905.

As a rookie, Cobb was subject to severe hazing by his veteran teammates, who were jealous of the young prospect. The players smashed his homemade bats, nailed his cleats in the clubhouse, doused his clothes before tying knots in them, and verbally abused him. Cobb later attributed his hostile temperament to this experience: "These old-timers turned me into a snarling wildcat." Tigers manager Hughie Jennings later acknowledged that Cobb was targeted for abuse by veteran players, some of whom sought to force him off the team. "I let this go for a while because I wanted to satisfy myself that Cobb has as much guts as I thought in the very beginning," Jennings recalled. "Well, he proved it to me, and I told the other players to let him alone. He is going to be a great baseball player and I won't allow him to be driven off this club."

The following year, 1906, Cobb became the Tigers' full-time center fielder and hit .316 in 98 games, setting a record for the highest batting average (minimum 310 plate appearances) for a 19-year-old (later bested by Mel Ott's .322 average in 124 games for the 1928 New York Giants). He never hit below that mark again. After being moved to right field, he led the Tigers to three consecutive American League pennants in 1907, 1908 and 1909. Detroit would lose each World Series (to the Cubs twice and then the Pirates); however, Cobb's postseason numbers were far below his career standard. Cobb did not get another opportunity to play on a pennant-winning team.

In 1907, Cobb reached first and then stole second, third and home. He accomplished the feat four times during his career, still an MLB record as of 2022. He finished the 1907 season with a league-leading .350 batting average, 212 hits, 49 steals and 119 runs batted in (RBI). At age 20, he was the youngest player to win a batting championship and held this record until 1955, when fellow Detroit Tiger Al Kaline won the batting title while twelve days younger than Cobb had been. Reflecting on his career in 1930, two years after retiring, he told Grantland Rice, "The biggest thrill I ever got came in a game against the Athletics in 1907 [on September 30]... The Athletics had us beaten, with Rube Waddell pitching.  They were two runs ahead in the 9th inning, when I happened to hit a home run that tied the score. This game went 17 innings to a tie, and a few days later, we clinched our first pennant. You can understand what it meant for a 20-year-old country boy to hit a home run off the great Rube, in a pennant-winning game with two outs in the ninth."

Despite great success on the field, Cobb was no stranger to controversy off it. As described in Smithsonian, "In 1907 during spring training in Augusta, Georgia, a black groundskeeper named Bungy Cummings, whom Cobb had known for years, attempted to shake Cobb's hand or pat him on the shoulder." The "overly familiar greeting infuriated" Cobb, who attacked Cummings. When Cummings' wife tried to defend him, Cobb allegedly choked her. The assault was only stopped when catcher Charles "Boss" Schmidt knocked Cobb out. However, aside from Schmidt's statement to the press, no other corroborating witnesses to the assault on Cummings ever came forward, and Cummings himself never made a public comment about it. Author Charles Leerhsen speculates that the assault on Cummings and his wife never occurred and that Schmidt likely made it up completely. Cobb had spent the previous year defending himself on several occasions from assaults by Schmidt, with Schmidt often coming out of nowhere to blindside Cobb. On that day, several reporters did see Cummings, who appeared to be "partially under the influence of liquor," approach Cobb and shout "Hello, Carrie!" (the meaning of which is unknown) and go in for a hug. Cobb then pushed him away, which was the last interaction that anyone saw between Cobb and Cummings. Shortly thereafter, hearing a fight, several reporters came running and found Cobb and Schmidt wrestling on the ground. When the fight was broken up and Cobb had walked away, Schmidt remained behind and told the reporters that he saw Cobb assaulting Cummings and his wife and had intervened. Leerhsen speculates that this was just another one of Schmidt's assaults on Cobb and that once discovered, Schmidt made up a story that made him sound like he had assaulted Cobb for a noble purpose. In 1908, Cobb attacked a black laborer in Detroit who complained when Cobb stepped into freshly poured asphalt; Cobb was found guilty of battery, but the sentence was suspended.

In September 1907, Cobb began a relationship with The Coca-Cola Company that lasted the remainder of his life. By the time he died, he held over 20,000 shares of stock and owned bottling plants in Santa Maria, California, Twin Falls, Idaho, and Bend, Oregon. He was also a celebrity spokesman for the product. In the offseason between 1907 and 1908, Cobb negotiated with Clemson Agricultural College of South Carolina, offering to coach baseball there "for $250 a month, provided that he did not sign with Detroit that season." This did not come to pass, however.

The following season, the Tigers finished ahead of the Chicago White Sox for the pennant. Cobb again won the batting title with a .324 average, but Detroit suffered another loss in the World Series. In August 1908, Cobb married Charlotte ("Charlie") Marion Lombard, the daughter of prominent Augustan Roswell Lombard. In the offseason, the couple lived on her father's Augusta estate, The Oaks, until they moved into their own house on Williams Street in November 1913.

The Tigers won the AL pennant again in 1909. During that World Series, Cobb's last, he stole home in the second game, igniting a three-run rally, but that was the high point for him, finishing with a lowly .231, as the Tigers lost to Honus Wagner and the powerful Pirates in seven games. Although he performed poorly in the postseason, he won the Triple Crown by hitting .377 with 107 RBI and nine home runs, all inside the park, thus becoming the only player of the modern era to lead his league in home runs in a season without hitting a ball over the fence.

In the same season, Charles M. Conlon snapped the famous photograph of a grimacing Cobb sliding into third base amid a cloud of dirt, which visually captured the grit and ferocity of his playing style.

1910: Chalmers Award controversy

Going into the final days of the 1910 season, Cobb had a .004 lead on Nap Lajoie for the American League batting title. The prize for the winner of the title was a Chalmers automobile. Cobb sat out the final two games to preserve his average. Lajoie hit safely eight times in a doubleheader but six of those hits were bunt singles. Later it was rumored that the opposing manager had instructed his third baseman to play extra deep to allow Lajoie to win the batting race over the generally disliked Cobb. Although Cobb was credited with a higher batting average, it was later discovered in the 1970s that one game had been counted twice so that Cobb actually lost to Lajoie. As a result of the incident, AL president Ban Johnson was forced to arbitrate the situation. He declared Cobb the rightful owner of the title, but car company president Hugh Chalmers chose to award one to both Cobb and Lajoie.

1911–1914

Cobb regarded baseball as "something like a war," future Tiger second baseman Charlie Gehringer said. "Every time at bat for him was a crusade." Baseball historian John Thorn said in the book Legends of the Fall, "He is testament to how far you can get simply through will. ... Cobb was pursued by demons."

Cobb was having a tremendous year in 1911, which included a 40-game hitting streak. Still, "Shoeless" Joe Jackson led him by .009 points in the batting race late in the season. Near the end of the season, Cobb's Tigers had a long series against Jackson's Cleveland Naps. Fellow Southerners Cobb and Jackson were personally friendly both on and off the field. Cobb used that friendship to his advantage. Cobb ignored Jackson when Jackson tried to say anything to him. When Jackson persisted, Cobb snapped angrily back at him, making him wonder what he could have done to enrage Cobb. Cobb felt that it was these mind games that caused Jackson to "fall off" to a final average of .408, twelve points lower than Cobb's .420, a 20th-century record which stood until George Sisler tied it and Rogers Hornsby surpassed it with .424, the record since then except for Hugh Duffy's .438 in the 19th century.

Cobb led the AL that year in numerous other categories, including 248 hits, 147 runs scored, 127 RBI, 83 stolen bases, 47 doubles, 24 triples and a .621 slugging percentage. Cobb hit eight home runs but finished second in that category to Frank Baker, who hit eleven. He was awarded another Chalmers car, this time for being voted the AL MVP by the Baseball Writers' Association of America.

On May 12, 1911, playing against the New York Highlanders, he scored from first base on a single to right field, then scored another run from second base on a wild pitch. In the seventh inning, he tied the game with a two-run double. The Highlanders catcher vehemently argued the safe call at second base with the umpire in question, going on at such length that the other Highlanders infielders gathered nearby to watch. Realizing that no one on the Highlanders had called time, Cobb strolled unobserved to third base, and then casually walked towards home plate as if to get a better view of the argument. He then suddenly broke into a run and slid into home plate for the eventual winning run. It was performances like this that led Branch Rickey to say later that Cobb "had brains in his feet."

Describing his gameplay strategy in 1930, he said, "My system was all offense. I believed in putting up a mental hazard for the other fellow. If we were five or six runs ahead, I'd try some wild play, such as going from first to home on a single. This helped to make the other side hurry the play in a close game later on. I worked out all the angles I could think of, to keep them guessing and hurrying." In the same interview, Cobb talked about having noticed a throwing tendency of first baseman Hal Chase but having to wait two full years until the opportunity came to exploit it. By unexpectedly altering his own baserunning tendencies, he was able to surprise Chase and score the winning run of the game in question.

On May 15, 1912, Cobb assaulted a heckler, Claude Lucker (often misspelled as Lueker), in the stands in New York's Hilltop Park where the Tigers were playing the Highlanders. Lucker, described by baseball historian Frank Russo as "a Tammany Hall lackey and two-bit punk," often berated Cobb when Detroit visited New York. In this game, the two traded insults with each other through the first couple of innings. Cobb at one point went to the Highlander dugout to look for the Highlanders' owner to try to have Lucker ejected from the game, but his search was in vain. He also asked for the police to intervene, but they refused. The situation climaxed when Lucker allegedly called Cobb a "half-nigger." Cobb, in his discussion of the incident in the Holmes biography, avoided such explicit words but alluded to Lucker's epithet by saying he was "reflecting on my mother's color and morals." He went on to state that he warned Highlander manager Harry Wolverton that if something wasn't done about that man, there would be trouble. No action was taken. At the end of the sixth inning, after being challenged by teammates Sam Crawford and Jim Delahanty to do something about it, Cobb climbed into the stands and attacked Lucker, who it turned out was handicapped (he had lost all of one hand and three fingers on his other hand in an industrial accident). Some onlookers shouted at him to stop because the man had no hands, to which Cobb reportedly retorted, "I don't care if he got no feet!" According to Russo, the crowd cheered Cobb on in the fight. Though extremely rare in the 21st century, attacking fans was not so unusual an activity in the early years of baseball. Other notable baseball stars who assaulted heckling fans include Babe Ruth, Cy Young, Rube Waddell, Kid Gleason, Sherry Magee, and Fred Clarke.

The league suspended him, and his teammates, though not fond of Cobb, went on strike to protest the suspension, and the lack of protection of players from abusive fans, before the May 18 game in Philadelphia. For that one game, Detroit fielded a replacement team made up of hastily recruited college and sandlot players plus two Tiger coaches and lost 24–2, thereby setting some of Major League Baseball's modern-era (post-1900) negative records, notably the 26 hits in a nine-inning game allowed by Allan Travers, who pitched one of the sport's most unlikely complete games. The pre-1901 record for the most hits and runs given up in a game is held by the Cleveland Blues' Dave Rowe. Primarily an outfielder, Rowe pitched a complete game on July 24, 1882, giving up 35 runs on 29 hits. The current post-1900 record for most hits in a nine-inning game is 31, set in 1992 by the Milwaukee Brewers against Toronto; however, the Blue Jays used six pitchers.

The strike ended when Cobb urged his teammates to return to the field. According to him, this incident led to the formation of a players' union, the "Ballplayers' Fraternity" (formally, the Fraternity of Professional Baseball Players of America), an early version of what is now called the Major League Baseball Players Association, which garnered some concessions from the owners.

During his career, Cobb was involved in numerous other fights, both on and off the field, and several profanity-laced shouting matches. For example, Cobb and umpire Billy Evans arranged to settle their in-game differences through fisticuffs under the grandstand after the game. Members of both teams were spectators, and broke up the scuffle after Cobb had knocked Evans down, pinned him and began choking him. In 1909, Cobb was arrested for assault for an incident that occurred in a Cleveland hotel. Cobb got into an argument with the elevator operator around 2:15 a.m. when the man refused to take him to the floor where some of his teammates were having a card game. The elevator operator stated that he could only take Cobb to the floor where his room was. As the argument escalated, a night watchman approached and he and Cobb eventually got into a physical confrontation. During the fight, Cobb produced a penknife and slashed the watchman across the hand. Cobb later claimed that the watchman, who had the upper hand in the fight, had his finger in Cobb's left eye and that Cobb was worried he was going to have his sight ruined. The fight finally ended when the watchman produced a gun and struck Cobb several times in the head, knocking him out. Cobb would later plead guilty to simple assault and pay a $100 fine. This incident has often been retold with the elevator operator and the watchman both being black. However, recent scholarship has shown that all parties involved were white.

In 1913, Cobb signed a contract worth $12,000 for the six-month season, making him likely the first baseball player in history to be paid a five-figure salary.

In June 1914, Cobb pleaded guilty to disturbing the peace after pulling a revolver during an argument at a Detroit butcher shop. He was fined $50.

1915–1921
In 1915, Cobb set the single-season record for stolen bases with 96, which stood until Dodger Maury Wills broke it in 1962. That year, he also won his ninth consecutive batting title, hitting .369.

During 1917 spring training, Cobb showed up late for a Dallas spring training doubleheader against the New York Giants because of a golf outing. Several of the Giants, including Buck Herzog, called him names from the bench. Cobb retaliated by spiking Herzog during the second game, prompting a bench-clearing brawl in which Cobb ground Herzog's face in the dirt. The Dallas Police Department had to help stop the brawl, and Cobb was thrown out of the game. Both teams were staying at the Oriental Hotel, and at dinner that evening, Herzog walked up to Cobb and challenged him to a fight. The two met an hour later in Cobb's room, where the Tiger outfielder had prepared for the fight by moving furniture out of the way and pouring water on the floor. Cobb's leather-soled shoes enabled him to get better footing than Herzog, who wore tennis shoes. The fight lasted for thirty minutes, over the course of which Cobb knocked down Herzog about six times while Herzog only knocked Cobb down once. The scuffle left Herzog's face bloodied and his eyes nearly shut. With McGraw vowing revenge, Cobb skipped the rest of the exhibition series against the Giants, heading to Cincinnati to train with the Reds, who were managed by Cobb's friend Christy Mathewson. However, Cobb later expressed the deepest respect for Herzog because of the way the infielder had conducted himself in the fight.

In 1917, Cobb hit in 35 consecutive games, still the only player with two 35-game hitting streaks (including his 40-game streak in 1911).  He had six hitting streaks of at least 20 games in his career, second only to Pete Rose's eight.

Also in 1917, Cobb starred in the motion picture Somewhere in Georgia for a sum of $25,000 plus expenses (equivalent to approximately $ today). Based on a story by sports columnist Grantland Rice, the film casts Cobb as "himself," a small-town Georgia bank clerk with a talent for baseball. Broadway critic Ward Morehouse called the movie "absolutely the worst flicker I ever saw, pure hokum."

In October 1918, Cobb enlisted in the Chemical Corps branch of the United States Army and was sent to the Allied Expeditionary Forces headquarters in Chaumont, France. He served approximately 67 days overseas before receiving an honorable discharge and returning to the United States. He was given the rank of captain underneath the command of Major Branch Rickey, the president of the St. Louis Cardinals. Other baseball players serving in this unit included Captain Christy Mathewson and Lieutenant George Sisler. All of these men were assigned to the Gas and Flame Division, where they trained soldiers in preparation for chemical attacks by exposing them to gas chambers in a controlled environment, which was eventually responsible for Mathewson's contracting tuberculosis, leading to his premature death on the eve of the 1925 World Series.

On August 19, 1921, in the second game of a doubleheader against Elmer Myers of the Boston Red Sox, Cobb collected his 3,000th hit. Aged 34 at the time, he is still the youngest ballplayer to reach that milestone, and in the fewest at-bats (8,093).

By 1920, Babe Ruth, sold to the renamed New York Yankees from the Boston Red Sox, had established himself as a power hitter, something Cobb was not considered to be. When his Tigers showed up in New York to play the Yankees for the first time that season, writers billed it as a showdown between two stars of competing styles of play. Ruth hit two homers and a triple during the series, compared to Cobb's one single.

As Ruth's popularity grew, Cobb became increasingly hostile toward him. He saw the Babe not only as a threat to his style of play, but also to his style of life.  Perhaps what angered him the most about Ruth was that despite Babe's total disregard for his physical condition and traditional baseball, he was still an overwhelming success and brought fans to the ballparks in record numbers to see him challenge his own slugging records.

On May 5, 1925, Cobb told a reporter that, for the first time in his career, he was going to try to hit home runs, saying he wanted to show that he could hit home runs but simply chose not to. That day, he went 6 for 6, with two singles, a double and three homers. The 16 total bases set a new AL record, which stood until May 8, 2012, when Josh Hamilton of the Texas Rangers hit four home runs and a double for a total of 18 bases. The next day Cobb had three more hits, two of which were home runs. The single his first time up gave him nine consecutive hits over three games, while his five homers in two games tied the record set by Cap Anson of the old Chicago NL team in 1884. By the end of the series Cobb had gone 12 for 19 with 29 total bases, and afterwards reverted to his old playing style. Even so, when asked in 1930 by Grantland Rice to name the best hitter he'd ever seen, Cobb answered, "You can't beat the Babe. Ruth is one of the few who can take a terrific swing and still meet the ball solidly. His timing is perfect. [No one has] the combined power and eye of Ruth."

Cobb as player/manager

Tigers owner Frank Navin tapped Cobb to take over for Hughie Jennings as manager for the 1921 season, a deal he signed on his 34th birthday for $32,500 (equivalent to approximately $ in today's terms). The signing surprised the baseball world. Although Cobb was a legendary player, he was disliked throughout the baseball community, even by his own teammates.

The closest Cobb came to winning another pennant was in 1924, when the Tigers finished in third place, six games behind the pennant-winning Washington Senators. The Tigers had also finished third in 1922, but 16 games behind the Yankees. Cobb blamed his lackluster managerial record (479 wins against 444 losses) on Navin, who was arguably even more frugal than he was, passing up several quality players Cobb wanted to add to the team. In fact, he had saved money by hiring Cobb to both play and manage.

In 1922, Cobb tied a batting record set by Wee Willie Keeler, with four five-hit games in a season. This has since been matched by Stan Musial, Tony Gwynn and Ichiro Suzuki. On May 10, 1924, Cobb was honored at ceremonies before a game in Washington, D.C., by more than 100 dignitaries and legislators. He received 21 books, one for each year in professional baseball.

At the end of 1925, Cobb was again embroiled in a batting title race, this time with one of his teammates and players, Harry Heilmann. In a doubleheader against the St. Louis Browns on October 4, 1925, Heilmann got six hits to lead the Tigers to a sweep of the doubleheader and beat Cobb for the batting crown, .393 to .389. Cobb and Browns player-manager George Sisler each pitched in the final game, Cobb pitching a perfect inning.

Move to Philadelphia
Cobb announced his retirement after a 22-year career as a Tiger in November 1926, and headed home to Augusta, Georgia. Shortly thereafter, Tris Speaker also retired as player-manager of the Cleveland Indians. The retirement of two great players at the same time sparked some interest, and it turned out that the two were coerced into retirement because of allegations of game-fixing brought about by Dutch Leonard, a former pitcher managed by Cobb.

Leonard accused former pitcher and outfielder Smoky Joe Wood and Cobb of betting on a Tigers–Indians game played in Detroit on September 25, 1919, in which they allegedly orchestrated a Tigers victory to win the bet. Leonard claimed proof existed in letters written to him by Cobb and Wood. Commissioner Kenesaw Mountain Landis held a secret hearing with Cobb, Speaker and Wood. A second secret meeting among the AL directors led to the unpublicized resignations of Cobb and Speaker; however, rumors of the scandal led Judge Landis to hold additional hearings in which Leonard subsequently refused to participate. Cobb and Wood admitted to writing the letters, but claimed that a horse-racing bet was involved and that Leonard's accusations were in retaliation for Cobb's having released him from the Tigers, thereby demoting him to the minor leagues. Speaker denied any wrongdoing.

On January 27, 1927, Judge Landis cleared Cobb and Speaker of any wrongdoing because of Leonard's refusal to appear at the hearings. Landis allowed both Cobb and Speaker to return to their original teams, but each team let them know that they were free agents and could sign with any club they wanted. Speaker signed with the Washington Senators for 1927, and Cobb with the Philadelphia Athletics. Speaker then joined Cobb in Philadelphia for the 1928 season. Cobb said he had come back only to seek vindication and say he left baseball on his own terms.

Cobb played regularly in 1927 for a young and talented team that finished second to one of the greatest teams of all time, the 110–44 1927 Yankees, returning to Detroit to a tumultuous welcome on May 10 and doubling his first time up to the cheers of Tigers fans. On July 18, Cobb became the first member of the 4,000 hit club when he doubled off former teammate Sam Gibson, still pitching for the Tigers, at Navin Field.

Cobb returned for the 1928 season but played less frequently due to his age and the blossoming abilities of the young A's, who were again in a pennant race with the Yankees. On September 3, Ty Cobb pinch-hit in the ninth inning of the first game of a doubleheader against the Senators and doubled off Bump Hadley for his last career hit although his last at-bat wasn't until September 11 against the Yankees, popping out off Hank Johnson and grounding out to shortstop Mark Koenig. He then announced his retirement, effective the end of the season, after batting .300 or higher in 23 consecutive seasons (the only season under .300 being his rookie season), a major league record that is unlikely to be broken. Despite not being known as a slugger, he led the AL in slugging percentage eight times in his 11 seasons from 1907 to 1917.

He also ended his career with a rather dubious record. When Cobb retired, he led AL outfielders for most errors all-time with 271, which still stands today. Nineteenth-century player Tom Brown holds the major league record with 490 errors committed as an outfielder, while the National League record is held by 19th-century player George Gore with 346 errors. Cobb ranks 14th on the all-time list for errors committed by an outfielder.

Post-playing career

Cobb retired a wealthy and successful man. He toured Europe with his family, went to Scotland for some time and then returned to his farm in Georgia. He spent his retirement pursuing his off-season avocations of hunting, golfing, polo and fishing. His other pastime was trading stocks and bonds, increasing his immense personal wealth. He was a major stockholder in the Coca-Cola Corporation, which by itself would have made him wealthy.

In the winter of 1930, Cobb moved into a Spanish ranch estate on Spencer Lane in the affluent town of Atherton located south of San Francisco, California, on the San Francisco Peninsula. At the same time, his wife Charlie filed the first of several divorce suits; but withdrew the suit shortly thereafter. The couple eventually divorced in 1947 after 39 years of marriage; the last few years of which Cobb's wife lived in nearby Menlo Park. The couple had three sons and two daughters: Tyrus Raymond Jr, Shirley Marion, Herschel Roswell, James Howell, and Beverly.

Cobb's children found him to be demanding, yet also capable of kindness and extreme warmth. He expected his sons to be exceptional athletes in general and baseball players in particular. Tyrus Raymond, Jr. flunked out of Princeton (where he had played on the varsity tennis team), much to his father's dismay. The elder Cobb subsequently traveled to the Princeton campus and beat his son with a whip to ensure against future academic failure. Tyrus Raymond, Jr. then entered Yale University and became captain of the tennis team while improving his academics, but was then arrested twice in 1930 for drunkenness and left Yale without graduating. Cobb helped his son deal with his pending legal problems, but then permanently broke off with him. Even though Tyrus Raymond, Jr. finally reformed and eventually earned an M.D. from the Medical College of South Carolina and practiced obstetrics and gynecology in Dublin, Georgia, until his death at 42 on September 9, 1952, from a brain tumor, his father remained distant.

In February 1936, when the first Baseball Hall of Fame election results were announced, Cobb had been named on 222 of 226 ballots, outdistancing Babe Ruth, Honus Wagner, Christy Mathewson, and Walter Johnson, the only others to earn the necessary 75% of votes to be elected that first year. His 98.2% stood as the record until Tom Seaver received 98.8% of the vote in 1992. Those results show that although many people disliked him personally, they respected the way he had played and what he had accomplished. In 1998, Sporting News ranked him as third on the list of 100 Greatest Baseball Players.

Of major league stars of the 1940s and 1950s, Cobb had positive things to say about Stan Musial, Phil Rizzuto, and Jackie Robinson, but few others.  Even so, he was known to help out young players. He was instrumental in helping Joe DiMaggio negotiate his rookie contract with the New York Yankees.

According to sportswriter Grantland Rice, he and Cobb were returning from the Masters golf tournament in the late 1940s and stopped at a Greenville, South Carolina, liquor store. Cobb noticed that the man behind the counter was "Shoeless" Joe Jackson, who had been banned from baseball almost 30 years earlier following the Black Sox scandal. Jackson did not appear to recognize him, and after making his purchase an incredulous Cobb asked, "Don't you know me, Joe?" "Sure, I know you, Ty" replied Jackson, "but I wasn't sure you wanted to know me. A lot of them don't."

Cobb was mentioned in the poem "Line-Up for Yesterday" by Ogden Nash:

Later life
At the age of 62, Cobb married a second time in 1949. His new wife was 40-year-old Frances Fairbairn Cass, a divorcée from Buffalo, New York. Their childless marriage also failed, ending with a divorce in 1956. At this time, Cobb became generous with his wealth, donating $100,000 in his parents' name for his hometown to build a modern 24-bed hospital, Cobb Memorial Hospital, which is now part of the Ty Cobb Healthcare System. He also established the Cobb Educational Fund, which awarded scholarships to needy Georgia students bound for college, by endowing it with a $100,000 donation in 1953 (equivalent to approximately $ in current year dollars ).

Cobb knew that another way he could share his wealth was by having biographies written that would both set the record straight on him and teach young players how to play. John McCallum spent some time with Cobb to write a combination how-to and biography titled The Tiger Wore Spikes: An Informal Biography of Ty Cobb that was published in 1956. In December 1959, he was diagnosed with prostate cancer, diabetes, high blood pressure, and Bright's disease.

It was also during his final years that Cobb began work on his autobiography, My Life in Baseball: The True Record, with writer Al Stump. Cobb retained editorial control over the book and the published version presented him in a positive light. Stump would claim say that the collaboration was contentious, and after Cobb's death Stump published two more books and a short story giving what he said was the "true story" One of these later books was used as the basis for the 1994 film Cobb (a box office flop starring Tommy Lee Jones as Cobb and directed by Ron Shelton). In 2010, an article by William R. "Ron" Cobb (no relation) in the peer-reviewed The National Pastime (the official publication of the Society for American Baseball Research) accused Stump of extensive forgeries of Cobb-related documents and diaries. The article further accused Stump of numerous false statements about Cobb in his last years, most of which were sensationalistic in nature and intended to cast Cobb in an unflattering light.

Death
In his last days, Cobb spent some time with the old movie comedian Joe E. Brown, talking about the choices he had made in his life. According to Brown, Cobb said he felt that he had made mistakes and that he would do things differently if he could. He had played hard and lived hard all his life, had no friends to show for it at the end, and regretted it. Publicly, however, he claimed to have no regrets: "I've been lucky. I have no right to be regretful of what I did."

He was taken to Emory University Hospital for the last time in June 1961 after falling into a diabetic coma.  His first wife, Charlie, his son Jimmy and other family members came to be with him for his final days. He died there on July 17, 1961, at age 74.

Approximately 150 friends and relatives attended a brief service in Cornelia, Georgia, and drove to the Cobb family mausoleum in Royston for the burial. Cobb's family kept the event private, not trusting the media to report accurately on it. Baseball's only representatives at his funeral were three old-time players, Ray Schalk, Mickey Cochrane and Nap Rucker, along with Sid Keener, the director of the Baseball Hall of Fame, but messages of condolences numbered in the hundreds and included notes from Joe DiMaggio and Ted Williams. Family in attendance included Cobb's former wife Charlie, his two daughters, his surviving son Jimmy, his two sons-in-law, his daughter-in-law Mary Dunn Cobb and her two children.

At the time of his death, Cobb's estate was reported to be worth at least $11.78 million (equivalent to $ today), including $10 million worth of General Motors stock and $1.78 million in The Coca-Cola Company stock.  His will left a quarter of his estate to the Cobb Educational Fund, and distributed the rest among his children and grandchildren. Cobb is interred in the Rose Hill Cemetery in Royston, Georgia. As of April 2021, the Ty Cobb Educational Foundation has distributed $19.2 million in college scholarships to needy Georgians.

Legacy

The historian Steven Elliott Tripp has explored the public's reaction to Cobb as a pioneer sports celebrity and "a player fans loved to hate." Tripp writes that Cobb was both loved and hated as a representative of a particular kind of masculinity on the field, inviting male spectators to participate in the contest through taunts directed at opposing players. Cobb's own sense of manhood, according to Tripp, was a product of his Southern upbringing that prized individualism, excitement, and family honor. Russo wrote, "There is no denying that Cobb ranks as one of baseball's greatest players, if not the game's fiercest competitor." Many of baseball's greatest players were friends with Cobb. Mathewson and Walter Johnson were some of his closest friends. Others included Joe DiMaggio,  Ted Williams, Home Run Baker, and Eddie Collins. Following his retirement, Cobb even befriended one of his greatest rivals, Babe Ruth, whose wife Claire was from Georgia.

Cobb has been judged by some historians and journalists as the best player of the dead-ball era, and is generally seen as one of the greatest players of all time.
 	
Some historians, including Wesley Fricks, Dan Holmes, and Charles Leerhsen, have defended Cobb against unfair portrayals of him in popular culture since his death. A noted case is the book written by sportswriter Al Stump in the months after Cobb died in 1961. Stump was later discredited when it became known that he had stolen items belonging to Cobb and also betrayed the access Cobb gave him in his final months. As a result of the movie Cobb, which starred Tommy Lee Jones, there are many myths surrounding Cobb's life, including one that he sharpened his spikes to inflict wounds on opposing players. This accusation was common for many decades before the movie was released.

Writing in The Journal of American Culture, Hunter M. Hampton says that Leerhsen "succeeds in debunking the myth of Cobb that Stump created, but he spawned a new myth by conflating Stump's shortcomings to depict Cobb as an egalitarian."

In 1977, a statue of Ty Cobb, designed by the sculptor Felix de Weldon, was installed outside the Atlanta–Fulton County Stadium. It would later be relocated to the front of the public library in his hometown of Royston in 2017.

Views on race
Cobb's father was a noted advocate for racial equality.

Stories of Cobb's racial intolerance during his playing days were embellished and falsified by his biographers Al Stump and Charles Alexander. Recent research on his life has clarified a number of stories about Cobb. Five years after Jackie Robinson broke the color barrier, Cobb publicly supported blacks and whites playing baseball together, adding: "Certainly it is okay for them to play. I see no reason in the world why we shouldn't compete with colored athletes as long as they conduct themselves with politeness and gentility. Let me say also that no white man has the right to be less of a gentleman than a colored man; in my book that goes not only for baseball but in all walks of life." Using even stronger language, Cobb told the Sporting News in 1952 that "the Negro should be accepted and not grudgingly but wholeheartedly." In 1953, black newspapers cited his praise for Brooklyn Dodgers' catcher Roy Campanella, who Cobb said was "among the all-time best catchers" in baseball. Following Campanella's accident that left him paralyzed, the Dodgers staged a tribute game where tens of thousands of spectators silently held lit matches above their heads. Cobb wrote the Dodgers owner to show appreciation "for what you did for this fine man." Cobb also stated that Willie Mays was the "only (then-current) player I'd pay money to see." In the obituaries that ran in the black press following Cobb's death, he was praised for "[speaking] in favor of racial freedom in baseball."

Rivalry with Sam Crawford
Sam Crawford and Ty Cobb were teammates for parts of thirteen seasons. They played beside each other in right and center field, and Crawford followed Cobb in the batting order year after year. Despite the physical closeness, the two had a complicated relationship.

Initially, they had a student-teacher relationship. Crawford was an established star when Cobb arrived, and Cobb eagerly sought his advice. In interviews with Al Stump, Cobb told of studying Crawford's base-stealing technique and of how Crawford would teach him about pursuing fly balls and throwing out base runners. Cobb told Stump he would always remember Crawford's kindness.

The student–teacher relationship gradually changed to one of jealous rivals.  Cobb was not popular with his teammates, and as Cobb became the biggest star in baseball, Crawford was unhappy with the preferential treatment given to Cobb. Cobb was allowed to show up late for spring training and was given private quarters on the road – perks not offered to Crawford. The competition between the two was intense. Crawford recalled that, if he went three for four on a day when Cobb went hitless, Cobb would turn red and sometimes walk out of the park with the game still on. When it was reported that Nap Lajoie had won the batting title, Crawford was alleged to have been one of several Tigers who sent a telegram to Lajoie congratulating him on beating Cobb.

In retirement, Cobb wrote a letter to a writer for The Sporting News accusing Crawford of not helping in the outfield and of intentionally fouling off balls when Cobb was stealing a base. Crawford learned about the letter in 1946 and accused Cobb of being a "cheapskate" who never helped his teammates. He said that Cobb had not been a very good fielder, "so he blamed me." Crawford denied intentionally trying to deprive Cobb of stolen bases, insisting that Cobb had "dreamed that up."

When asked about the feud, Cobb attributed it to envy. He felt that Crawford was "a hell of a good player," but he was "second best" on the Tigers and "hated to be an also ran." Cobb biographer Richard Bak noted that the two "only barely tolerated each other" and agreed with Cobb that Crawford's attitude was driven by Cobb's having stolen Crawford's thunder.

Although they may not have spoken to each other, Cobb and Crawford developed an ability to communicate non-verbally with looks and nods on the base paths. They became one of the most successful double steal pairings in baseball history.

Regular season statistics
Cobb has the highest batting average in major league history, .366. In Cobb's time, major league records were kept very well, but not with the absolute accuracy seen later and since. Thus, for many years, Cobb's lifetime batting average was reported as .367, but rigorous research of source documents late 20th century found that this is wrong, as some games had been reported wrongly:

All sources with standing agree that Cobb's lifetime batting average is .366 (except MLB.com, see below); some show slightly different numbers for at-bats and hits, but all devolve to .366. SABR (the Society for American Baseball Research) (seconded by John Thorn and Pete Palmer, among others), the Baseball Almanac, and ESPN credit Cobb with 4,189 hits in 11,434 at-bats. Retrosheet gives Cobb the same number of hits in five more at-bats (11,439), and Baseball Reference and the Baseball Hall of Fame add one more at-bat (11,440). All of these round to .366.

MLB.com lists Cobb's lifetime average as .367 (4,191 hits in 11,429 at-bats), the number that had been reported and believed true from Cobb's retirement until the late 20th century. (Other pages on the website do give the correct value.) According to former Baseball Commissioner Bowie Kuhn, Major League Baseball continues and will continue to report the incorrect value on the basis of it being grandfathered in ("The passage of 70 years, in our judgment, constitutes a certain statute of limitation as to recognizing any changes.") 

According to Retrosheet, Cobb recorded 1 six-hit game, 13 five-hit games, and 82 four-hit games in his MLB career. 
  
Baseball (the sport) does not have official statistics. In C.B.C. Distribution Marketing v. Major League Baseball, the United States Court of Appeals for the Eighth Circuit upholding a 2007 judgement by the United States District Court for the Eastern District of Missouri, ruled that baseball statistics, as being mere facts, are in the public domain are not the property of Major League Baseball Enterprises, Inc. or any other private or public entity. However, because Major League Baseball Enterprises, Inc. does have some official legal rights and responsibilities concerning major league baseball – enforcing copyrights on team logos, making the official rules used by the teams, and so forth – and because Major League Baseball does empower the Elias Sports Bureau with "official provider of MLB statistics" status - confusion sometimes arises and thus a few sources can still describe Cobb's major league batting average as being "officially" .367. "Official" in that sense of the word means merely "from the office" of Major League Baseball, the corporation.

Cobb's career totals from Baseball Reference are as follows. Other sources may have slightly different figures. Caught Stealing is not shown comprehensively because the stat was not regularly recorded until 1920.

Cobb's career totals published by Major League Baseball Enterprises, Inc. are shown below:

See also
 Somewhere in Georgia (1917 film)
 3,000-hit club
 List of Major League Baseball stolen base records
 List of Major League Baseball hit records
List of Major League Baseball single-game hits leaders
List of Major League Baseball player-managers
 List of Major League Baseball individual streaks
 List of Major League Baseball record holders
 Triple Crown
Major League Baseball titles leaders
John Franklin Cobb House, home of Cobb's grandfather in Cherokee County, North Carolina
Ty Cobb Museum
1912 Detroit Tigers strike

References

Further reading

 

 (Nominee for the 2007 CASEY Award. See The Casey Award; Ron Kaplan's Baseball Bookshelf.)

External links

Official site
Ty Cobb Museum
"Fast Running Got Ty Cobb to his Wedding on Time," Atlanta Georgian, August 7, 1908, Atlanta Historic Newspapers Archive, Digital Library of Georgia.
"Timeline of Ty Cobb's Life" 
Ty Cobb: The Georgia Peach historical marker

 
1886 births
1961 deaths
National Baseball Hall of Fame inductees
Major League Baseball center fielders
Detroit Tigers players
Philadelphia Athletics players
Baseball players from Georgia (U.S. state)
American Freemasons
American League Triple Crown winners
American League stolen base champions
Detroit Tigers managers
Augusta Tourists players
Anniston (minor league baseball) players
United States Army officers
American Episcopalians
Deaths from prostate cancer
Baseball players from Detroit
Baseball players from Atlanta
Burials in Georgia (U.S. state)
Deaths from cancer in Georgia (U.S. state)
People from Royston, Georgia
United States Army personnel of World War I
Major League Baseball player-managers
People from Banks County, Georgia
People from Atherton, California
Violence in sports